An electric dipole transition is the dominant effect of an interaction of an electron in an atom with the electromagnetic field.

Following reference, consider an electron in an atom with quantum Hamiltonian , interacting with a plane electromagnetic wave

 

Write the Hamiltonian of the electron in this electromagnetic field as

Treating this system by means of time-dependent perturbation theory, one finds that the most likely transitions of the electron from one state to the other occur due to the summand of  written as

 

Electric dipole transitions are the transitions between energy levels in the system with the Hamiltonian .

Between certain electron states the electric dipole transition rate may be zero due to one or more selection rules, particularly the angular momentum selection rule. In such a case, the transition is termed electric dipole forbidden, and the transitions between such levels must be approximated by higher-order transitions.

 

and describes magnetic dipole transitions.

Even smaller contributions to transition rates are given by higher electric and magnetic multipole transitions.

Semi-classical approach 

One way of modelling and understanding the effect of light (mainly electric field) on an atom is to look at a simpler model consisting of three energy levels. In this model, we have simplified our atom to a transition between a state of 0 angular momentum (to a state of angular momentum of 1. This could be, for example, the transition in hydrogen between the 1s (ground state) and the 2p state.

This assumption has no real loss of generality. In fact if we were to choose another axis, then we would be able to find another state that would be a linear combination of the previous states which would be parallel to the electric field bringing us back to this assumption of a linearly polarized electric field parallel with the transition axis.

Now, the main question we want to solve is what is the average force felt by the atom under this kind of light? In here the brackets represent an average over all the internal states of the atom (in a quantum fashion), and the bar represent a temporal average in the classical fashion.  represents the potential due to the electric dipole of the atom.

This potential can be further be written as  where  is the dipole operator.

.
Then
 .

Now, the semi-classical approach means that we write the dipole moment as the polarizability of the atom times the electric field:

And as such  and thus , and as such we have .

Before progressing in the math, and trying to find a more explicit expression for the proportionality constant , there's an important aspect that we need to discuss. That is that we have found that the potential felt by an atom in a light induced potential follows the square of the time averaged electric field. This is important to a lot of experimental physics in cold atom physics where physicists use this fact to understand what potential is applied to the atoms using the known intensity of the laser light applied to atoms since the intensity of light is proportional itself to the square of the time averaged electric field, i.e. .

Now, let's look at how to get the expression of the polarizability .

We will use the density matrix formalism, and the optical Bloch equations for this.

Here is where the optical Bloch equations will come in handy, they give us an equation to understand the dynamics of the density matrix.

Indeed, we have:

 which accounts for the reversible normal quantum evolution of the density matrix.

and another term that describes the spontaneous emissions of the atom:

Where  is our semi-classical hamiltonian. And .  represents the linewidth of the transition, and thus you can see  as the half-life of the given transition.

Let us introduce the Rabi frequency :

We get:

We can then repeat the process for all 4 matrix elements, but in our study we will apply a small field approximation, so that the electric field is small enough that we can uncouple the 4 equations. This approximation is written mathematically using the Rabi frequency as:

Then we can neglect , and set .

We can then rewrite the evolution equation to:

This is an ordinary first order differential equation with an inhomogeneous term in cosines. This can easily be solved by using the Euler's formula for the cosine.

We get the following solution:

and

And coming back to our average dipole moment:

 with 

Then it is clear that , and the polarizability becomes .

Finally, we can write the potential felt by the atom in due to the electric dipole interaction as:

The essential points worth discussing here are as said previously that the light intensity  of the laser produces a proportional local potential which the atoms "feel" in that region. Furthermore, now we can tell the sign of such potential. This implies that the potential is attractive if we have a red detuned laser, and it is repulsive if we have a blue detuned laser.

See also
Dipole
Electric dipole moment
Electromagnetism
Magnetic dipole transition

References 

Quantum mechanics